Rich people may refer to:
 Rich People (EP)
 Rich People (film)

See also 
 High-net-worth individual, financial industry term for people whose investible assets exceed some threshold
 Lists of people by net worth
 Rich People Problems, 2017 novel by Singaporean writer Kevin Kwan
 Rich (disambiguation)